This is a list of venues used for professional baseball in Cleveland, Ohio. The information is a compilation of the information contained in the references listed. The street system was reworked about 1905, resulting in many formerly named streets becoming numbered streets.

Baseball parks in Cleveland 

Case Commons
Home of: Forest City - independent - amateur (1866-69) / professional (1870)
Location: East 38th Street (was Catawba Street - the nearby Case Avenue was renamed 40th); Garden Street (now Central Avenue); Scovill Avenue (this portion was later renamed Community College Avenue)
Currently: residential

National Association Grounds
Home of:
Forest City - National Association (1871-1872)
various amateur teams through the years
Cleveland Forest City - United States Baseball League (1912)
Location: Willson Avenue (now East 55th Street); Garden Street (now Central Avenue)
Currently: commercial

National League Park (I) or Kennard Street Ball Park
Home of: Cleveland Blues - National League (1879-1884)
Location: Kennard (now East 46th) Street (west, third base); Sibley Street (now Carnegie Avenue) (north, left field); buildings and Wilson Avenue (now East 55th Street) (east, right field); Cedar Avenue (south, first base)
Currently: commercial

National League Park (II)
Home of: Cleveland Spiders - American Association (1887-1888) / National League (1889-1890)
Location: East 35th (was Douglass) Street (west); Payne Avenue (north); East 39th (was Clifton) Street (east); Euclid Avenue (south)
Currently: commercial

Brotherhood Park
Home of: Cleveland - Players' League (1890)
Location: Willson Avenue (now East 55th Street); Nickel Plate Railroad tracks (now Metro tracks)
Currently: commercial

League Park aka Dunn Field 1921-1929
Home of:
Cleveland Spiders - NL (1891-1899)
Cleveland Indians - American League (1900 [as minor league], 1901-31 full time, 1932-1946 part time)
Cleveland Bearcats / Spiders - American Association (1914-1915)
Cleveland Red Sox – Negro National League (1934)
Cleveland Buckeyes - Negro American League (1943-1948) 
Location: Lexington Ave (south, right field); East 66th Street (originally Dunham) (west, first base); Linwood Avenue (originally Beecher) (north, third base); residences and East 70th Street (originally Russell) (east, beyond left field)
Currently: League Park public playground

Tate Field renamed Hooper Field
Home of:
Cleveland Tate Stars - Negro National League and others (1919-1923)
Cleveland Browns – Negro National League (1920–1931) (1924 only)
Cleveland Elites – NNL (1926 only)
Cleveland Hornets – NNL (1927 only)
Location: Beyerle Road Southeast (northeast, third base); Sykora Road Southeast (southeast, left field); Harwood Avenue Southeast (north, home plate - street no longer exists); Hugo Avenue (T-ing into the Beyerle-Harwood intersection)
Currently: golf course

Luna Park (Luna Bowl)
Home of:
Cleveland Green Sox - Federal League (1913)
Cleveland Tigers – NNL (1928 only)
Cleveland Giants – Negro National League (1933 only)
Location of amusement park and ballpark within it: Mt. Carmel Road (originally Ingersoll Road) (northeast); East 110th Street (east); Woodland Avenue (south, first base); Woodhill Road (northwest, third base)
Currently: housing

Cleveland Hardware Field
Home of:
Cleveland Cubs – NNL (1931 only – some games)
Cleveland Stars Negro East-West League (1932 only)
Location: East 79th Street and Kinsman Road Southeast
Currently: housing

Cleveland Stadium 
Home of:
Cleveland Cubs (1931 only – some games)
Cleveland Indians - AL (1932-1946 part time, 1947-1993 full time)
Location: 1085 West 3rd Street (first base side); Lake Erie (third base side)
Currently: site of FirstEnergy Stadium

Progressive Field orig. Jacobs Field
Home of: Cleveland Guardians - AL (1994-present)
Location: 2401 Ontario Street (southwest, third base); Carnegie Avenue (southeast, first base); Wigman Court (east, right field corner); East 9th Street (northeast, right field); Eagle Avenue (northwest and west, left field and left field corner)

See also
Lists of baseball parks

References

Baseball Memories, by Marc Okkonen, Sterling Publishing, 1992.

External links
Tate Stars
more on Tate Stars
Sanborn map showing part of Tate Field, 1950

Baseball venues in Ohio
Cleveland, Ohio
Sports venues in Cleveland
Baseball
baseball parks